Filippo Lauri (25 August 1623 - 12 December 1694) was an Italian painter of the Baroque period, active mainly in Rome.

Born and active in Rome, his story was featured in the biographies by Baldinucci. He first studied with his father, Balthasar Lauwers (Italianized as Lauri), who was a Flemish landscape painter; and then studied with his elder brother, Francesco Lauri. Afterwards, he worked under his brother-in-law, Angelo Caroselli. Filippo's brother had been a pupil of Andrea Sacchi. In 1654 Lauri became a member of the Accademia di San Luca in Rome, and later became  the Principe or director of the academy. He painted along with Filippo Gagliardi a canvas depiction of Celebrations for Christine of Sweden at Palazzo Barberini (now at Palazzo Braschi), which demonstrates the exuberant pageantry common in their time.

Filippo's father had emigrated from Antwerp, and was a pupil of Paul Bril. Filippo's oldest brother Francesco Lauri was also a painter and a pupil of Andrea Sacchi, who died young. Fillipo often painted small figures for the landscapes of Claude Lorraine. He was prolific. He employed many engravers.

Sources
See Artists in biographies by Filippo Baldinucci

 Grove Encyclopedia entry.
Web Gallery of Art biography.

1623 births
1694 deaths
Painters from Rome
17th-century Italian painters
Italian male painters
Italian Baroque painters